Giuseppe Antonio Ermenegildo Prisco (8 September 1833 – 4 February 1923) was an Italian Cardinal of the Roman Catholic Church, who served as Archbishop of Naples.

Biography
Prisco was born in Boscotrecase, near Naples. He was educated at the Archiepiscopal Seminary of Naples.

He was ordained to the priesthood in September 1856 with an indult because he had not yet reached the canonical age for the appointment. He served as Professor of philosophy at the seminary where he himself was taught. He later served as professor of rational law at Ospizio Ecclesiastico di Maria, Naples. He was also Prefect of studies at the Archiepiscopal Seminary of Naples and Examiner of the clergy. He was a representative of Archbishop Guglielmo Sanfelice d'Acquavilla to the Società Cattoliche Operaie. 
 
He was created Cardinal Deacon of S. Cesareo in Palatio by Pope Leo XIII in the consistory of 30 November 1896, receiving his red biretta on 3 December. He opted for the order of cardinal priests and title of San Sisto on 24 March 1898.

He was appointed as Archbishop of Naples on 24 March 1898 and was consecrated on 29 May 1898 in the Sistine Chapel by Pope Leo XIII. He participated in the conclave of 1903 that elected Pope Pius X. He did not participate in the conclaves of 1914 and 1922 because of poor health. He died on 4 February 1923 of pulmonary disease in Naples at the age of 89.

References

1833 births
1923 deaths
People from the Province of Naples
20th-century Italian cardinals
Cardinals created by Pope Leo XIII
Archbishops of Naples
19th-century Italian Roman Catholic archbishops
20th-century Italian Roman Catholic archbishops